Victoria Muratore (born 2 August 1994) is a Brazilian water polo player.

She was part of the Brazilian team at the 2013 World Aquatics Championships,

References

External links
 https://www.gettyimages.com/detail/news-photo/victoria-muratore-of-brazil-looks-to-pass-the-ball-under-news-photo/174182492

Brazilian female water polo players
Living people
Place of birth missing (living people)
1994 births